The 2014–15 George Mason Patriots men's basketball team represented George Mason University during the 2014–15 NCAA Division I men's basketball season. It was the 49th season for the program. The Patriots, led by fourth year head coach Paul Hewitt, competed in their second season in the Atlantic 10 Conference. They finished the season 9–22, 4–14 in A-10 play to finish in a tie for twelfth place. They lost in first round of the A-10 tournament to Fordham.

On March 16, head coach Paul Hewitt was fired. He finished at George Mason with a four-year record of 66–67.

Offseason

Departures

Incoming Transfers

Awards
Atlantic 10 All-Conference Third Team
 Shevon Thompson

Atlantic 10 Rookie of the Week
 Isaiah Jackson - Mar. 2

Roster

Stats

Schedule and results

|-
! colspan="12" style="background:#063; color:#fc3;"| Exhibition

|-
! colspan="12" style="background:#063; color:#fc3;"| Non-conference regular season

|-
! colspan="12" style="background:#063; color:#fc3;"| Atlantic 10 regular season

|-
! colspan="15" style="background:#063; color:#fc3;"| Atlantic 10 tournament

Recruiting
The following is a list of players signed for the 2015–16 season:

See also
2014–15 George Mason Patriots women's basketball team

References

George Mason Patriots men's basketball seasons
George Mason
George Mason men's basketball
George Mason